The Forces of Evil was an Orange County-based ska punk band, formed in January 2001 with the intention of creating a ska supergroup, being the side project of fellow ska punk band Reel Big Fish. The band split in 2005 after releasing a four-song EP, which was available on their website. Their website hasn't seen an update since December 2004, and their touring has ceased.

History
Aaron Evil, guitar (Aaron Barrett), of Reel Big Fish fame, formed The Forces Of Evil in January 2001 by recruiting three members of the then recently defunct ska group Jeffries Fan Club at their farewell concert, Justin Evil, drums (Justin Ferreira), Chris Evil, trombone (Chris Colonnier) and Derek Evil, bass (Derek Gibbs). Jay Evil, trumpet (Jay Lafayette of The Scholars) and Jonny Evil, trombone (John Throop of Lone Raspberry) were later added to the line-up, and with the addition of friend John Evil, trumpet (John Christianson), the band was made complete.

Between formation and June 2002, the band played many concerts across the U.S., playing both songs written by the band and covers of other songs from many genres.

In June 2002, the band released their first record, an EP titled Because We Care..., featuring tracks that had seen popular receptions during concerts. The first album to be released by The Forces Of Evil appeared in October 2003, titled Friend Or FOE? and featuring all of the tracks previously released on the EP as well as many new tracks, one of particular note being "Fight", which was the theme song for Ska Summit 2003, a huge achievement for such a newly formed band and one that served to increase the group's popularity not only in US Ska circles but also in Ska fans across the world. As such, the band was signed by Jive Records.

As of March 2005, The Forces Of Evil were still recording their second album for Jive Records. According to their online message boards, The Forces of Evil have broken up. This has not been confirmed, though is supported by the fact that they released a Four Song Obituary album available freely on the web.

Barrett has stated that the Forces of Evil are finished as a band.  He said that the work effort was too similar to the work he was doing with Reel Big Fish, and he has decided to concentrate his efforts on the other band. Both John Christianson and Derek Gibbs subsequently started playing in Reel Big Fish officially.

Barrett also said that the Forces of Evil was just a fall-back plan because he believed that Reel Big Fish was going to tank after releasing Cheer Up! because he thought everyone would hate it. He said he started FoE because "if Reel Big Fish was over, then I'd still want to prove to everyone that I still love ska and love to play it." This was said in the commentary of Reel Big Fish's DVD You're All In This Together in their new live album "Our Live Album Is Better Than Your Live Album." Barrett also noted the president of Jive at the time of the release of Friend or Foe? was angered by the fact that it was not the new Reel Big Fish album, and wondered why it wasn't. Former Reel Big Fish bassist Matt Wong said he wondered the same thing as well.

Members
Aaron Evil (Aaron Barrett) - Guitar, Lead Vocals (Reel Big Fish)
Juston Evil (Justin Ferriera) - Drums (Jeffries Fan Club)
Chris Evil (Chris Colonnier) - Trombone (Jeffries Fan Club)
Derek Evil (Derek Gibbs) - Bass (Jeffries Fan Club)
Jay Evil (Jay Lafayette) - Trumpet (the Scholars)
Jonny Evil (John Throop) - Trombone (Lone Raspberry)
John Evil (John Christianson) - Trumpet (Reel Big Fish)

Discography
Because We Care... (EP, 2002)
"Vague Love Song"
"My Life"
"Mistake"
"Independent"
"Angry Anthem No. 347"
"Fight For Your Right to Skank"

Friend or Foe? (Album, 2003)
"Angry Anthem"
"Go To Hell" (Suburban Rhythm cover)
"My Life"
"Dance the Night Away" (Van Halen cover)
"Vague Love Song"
"Hey! Woo! Yeah!"
"Mistake"
"Worst Day"
"Maybe I'm Wrong"
"Independent"
"Fight"

"99 Hell" (Jay-Z Remix) (mp3 Download, 2004)
"Ball & Chain" (Sublime cover) (Forever Free: Sublime Tribute, 2005)
Four Song Obituary (EP, 2005)
"Good Old Days"
"Ska Show"
"Evil Approaches"
"Missing Piece"

American ska musical groups
Third-wave ska groups
Musical groups from Orange County, California